Afrik Air Links was a privately owned airline based in Freetown, Sierra Leone, operating chartered flights within West Africa. The airline was founded in 1991, and ceased in 2005.

The airline's fleet consisted of Soviet built aircraft, including the Yakovlev Yak-40, and the Tupolev Tu-134A.

References

Defunct airlines of Sierra Leone
Airlines established in 1991
Airlines disestablished in 2005
Airlines formerly banned in the European Union
1991 establishments in Sierra Leone
Companies based in Freetown